A by-election was held for the New South Wales Legislative Assembly electorate of The Castlereagh on 24 November 1906 because of the death of Hugh Macdonald.

Dates

Result

Hugh Macdonald died.

See also
Electoral results for the district of Castlereagh
List of New South Wales state by-elections

Notes

References

1906 elections in Australia
New South Wales state by-elections
1900s in New South Wales